South Africa national rugby union team players hold several international records. Several players from the South Africa national rugby union team have joined the IRB and International Hall of Fame.

Individual records

Career 

South Africa's most capped player is Victor Matfield with 127 caps. Matfield was the most-capped lock for any nation in rugby history, with all of his 127 appearances at that position in 2011, this record has now been overtaken by Alun Wyn Jones. The most-capped back is Bryan Habana, with 124 caps over a thirteen year career. Percy Montgomery holds the South African record for Test points with 893, which at the time of his international retirement placed him sixth on the all-time list of Test point scorers (he now stands eleventh).(as at 10 December 2019)

Morné Steyn holds the Springbok record for the fastest 100 points (8 Test matches)

Although statistics on the success rate of kicks at goal were not kept until the late 1980s, it is believed that Steyn also holds the record for most consecutive successful kicks at goal in Tests. He had a streak of 41 successful kicks at goal, which started during the Boks' Test against Italy on 19 June 2010 and ended on 6 November 2010 against Ireland.

John Smit was the world's most-capped captain, having captained South Africa in 82 of his 111 Tests. He has since been overtaken by Richie McCaw and Brian O'Driscoll. The world's most-capped lock pairing is that of Victor Matfield and Bakkies Botha, who have started together in 62 Tests. Smit also played 46 consecutive matches for South Africa, which is a record.

The record try scorer is Bryan Habana with 67 international tries.(as at 14 February 2018)

Single match

Fly-half Jannie de Beer holds the world record for dropped goals in a Test match (5, during the 44–21 quarter-final win over England in the 1999 Rugby World Cup)

The most points Montgomery ever scored in a single international was 35 against Namibia in 2007—this is also a South African record.

On 1 August during the 2009 Tri Nations tournament, Morné Steyn set a number of records during the second Test between the Springboks and the All Blacks. The Springboks won 31–19, with Steyn scoring all South Africa's points – 1 try, 1 conversion, 8 penalties. This gave him records for:
Most points scored by any player in a Tri Nations match, surpassing Andrew Mehrtens (All Blacks vs. Australia, 1999).
Most points ever scored by an individual in a Test against the All Blacks, passing Christophe Lamaison's 29 (France, 1999).
World record for most points scored by a player who has scored all their team's points.
South African record for penalties in a test (8) – beating the seven achieved twice by Montgomery.

Hall of Fame players

Eleven former South African international players have been inducted into either the International Rugby Hall of Fame or the IRB Hall of Fame. Six are members of the International Rugby Hall of Fame only; two are members of the IRB Hall of Fame only, and four are members of both Halls of Fame.

Barry "Fairy" Heatlie, who played in the late 19th century and into the early 20th, was one of the early greats of South African rugby. He appeared for Western Province 34 times between 1890 and 1904, with 28 of them being Currie Cup wins. He also played six Tests for South Africa against the Lions in 1891, 1896, and 1903, and also captained the side to their only two Test wins of the 1890s. Arguably his greatest legacy to South African rugby is the green jersey; he is credited with introducing the colour for South Africa's 1903 Test against the Lions at Newlands. He was inducted into the IRB Hall of Fame in 2009.

Bennie Osler played 17 consecutive Tests between 1924 and 1933. Playing at fly-half, his first Test was against the touring British team in 1924. He also played in the series against the All Blacks in 1928, but most notably captained the Springboks on their Grand Slam tour of 1931–32 when they defeated all four Home Nations. His last Tests were the five played against Australia when they toured to South Africa in 1933. Osler was inducted to the International Rugby Hall of Fame in 2007 and the IRB Hall of Fame in 2009.

Making his Test debut in Olser's Grand Slam winning team in 1931 was scrum-half Danie Craven. Craven played several positions including fly-half, scrum-half, centre and even number-eight. However Craven was most famous for popularising the dive pass. As well as winning a Grand Slam with Osler's team, Craven toured with 1937 Springboks to New Zealand where they achieved their first series victory over New Zealand. His last act as player was captaining South Africa in a Test series against the Lions. Craven's involvement with the Springboks continued after his playing retirement, and he coached them to a 4–0 series win over the touring All Blacks in 1949. He was elected President of the South African Rugby Board in 1956, a position he held until the post-apartheid South African Rugby Union was formed in 1991. Craven was instrumental in the formation of the South African Rugby Union and became its first Executive President. Such was Craven's influence in South African rugby he became known as "Mr Rugby", was inducted into the International Hall of Fame in 1997, and was in the second class of inductees into the IRB Hall of Fame in 2007; behind Rugby School and William Webb Ellis.

The man most credited with inventing modern number 8 play was Hennie Muller, inducted into the International Hall of Fame in 2001. He played 13 Tests between 1949 and 1953, and in the process won a 4–0 series victory over the All Blacks and a Grand Slam tour of Britain and Ireland. He was nicknamed Windhond (greyhound) for his speed around the field. When writing about the 1949 series against the All Blacks, Harding and Williams wrote: "(Okey) Geffin won the series, perhaps, but Muller made it possible." Of Muller's 13 Tests, he only lost one—against Australia in 1953.

Named South Africa's player of the 20th Century in 2000, Frik du Preez played 38 Tests between 1961 and 1971. Du Preez could play both flanker or lock and was one of the most dominant forwards of the 1960s, but was especially well known for his all round skills. Danie Craven said of du Preez, "To my mind he could have played any position on a rugby field with equal brilliance." He was inducted into the International Rugby Hall of Fame in 1997 and the IRB Hall of Fame in 2009.

Morne du Plessis played 22 Tests for South Africa between 1971 and 1980. His debut was at Number 8 in South Africa's series win over Australia in 1971. He went on to captain South Africa and became part of the only father-son pair to captain South Africa—his father had captained South Africa in 1949. He led South Africa to a 3–1 series win over the All Blacks in 1976 and a series win over the British and Irish Lions in 1980 by the same margin. Du Plessis would be inducted into the International Hall of Fame in 1999.

International Hall of Fame inductees Naas Botha, inducted in 2005, and Danie Gerber, inducted in 2007, both had careers interrupted by South Africa's sporting isolation in the 1980s and early 1990s. Botha made his Test debut against the South American Jaguars in 1980. Playing at fly-half, Botha played 28 Tests and scored 312 Test points before his international retirement in 1992. Botha contributed significantly to the Springboks 1980 series win over the Lions, and also played for the World XV in the IRB Centenary Match at Twickenham. Gerber also made his debut in 1980, and scored 19 tries in his 24 Tests before retiring in 1992. He scored a hat-trick against England in 1984, and played alongside Botha in the World XV team in 1986. In South Africa's first Test since the fall of apartheid, against the All Blacks in 1992, he scored twice.

Two players that straddled the amateur and professional eras were Francois Pienaar and Joost van der Westhuizen. Both first played for the Springboks in 1993. Pienaar was named captain in his first Test against France, and went on to captain the side to the 1995 World Cup. It was there he captained South Africa to the World Cup title, and received the trophy from Nelson Mandela who was wearing his number 6 jersey. Nelson Mandela later wrote "It was under Francois Pienaar's inspiring leadership that rugby became the pride of the entire country. Francois brought the nation together." Pienaar entered the International Hall of Fame in 2005, and was inducted into the IRB Hall in 2011 alongside all other World Cup-winning captains from the inaugural event in 1987 through 2007 (minus the previously inducted Australian John Eales). Joost van der Westhuizen also participated in the 1995 World cup victory, but went on to play in two more World Cups. Playing at scrum-half, van der Westhuizen played 89 Tests for South Africa and scored 38 tries. At the time of his retirement following the 2003 World Cup he was South Africa's leading try scorer and most capped player. He entered the International Hall of Fame two years after Pienaar, in 2007.

The newest Springbok player to enter the IRB Hall is John Smit, inducted in 2011 alongside Pienaar. The captain of the 2007 World Cup winners, Smit (as noted earlier) ended his international career as the most-capped Springbok in history.

List
As at 9 July 2022, 929 South African rugby union players have represented the Springboks, either by playing in a test match or touring with the national side.

Players included in the 2021 Rugby Championship squad are indicated in green.

References

External links
 Springbok rugby hall of fame
 SA Rugby

 
South Africa